Norman Bailey may refer to:

Norman Bailey (bass-baritone) (1933–2021), British operatic bass-baritone
Norman Bailey (footballer) (1857–1923), English footballer
Norman Bailey (musician) (1913–1984), American musician with the Lawrence Welk orchestra
Norman Bailey (government official) (born 1931), American former senior staffer of the National Security Council
E. Norman Bailey, British architect, particularly of cinemas